The Eastern United States Pipe Band Association (EUSPBA) is an association of pipe bands in the Eastern United States and is a member of the Alliance of North American Pipe Band Associations. Its function is to sanction band and solo piping, drumming, and drum major competitions in the East Coast. It is also responsible for ranking and regrading its members.

It comprises several local branches as well:
     Metro – Metropolitan NYC/NJ
     MidAtlantic – DE, MD, NJ, PA (east), VA
     Northeast – CT, MA, ME, NH, NY, RI, VT
     Ohio Valley – KY, OH, PA (west), WV
     Southern – AL, FL, GA, MS, NC, SC, TN
     Southwest – AR, LA, OK, TX

History
The EUSPBA was founded in 1964 in order to provide a uniform means of competition between pipe bands in the Midatlantic East Coast. It has over 130 member bands across the Eastern United States, including the grade one City of Dunedin Pipe Band, grade two bands of Great Lakes Pipe Band, MacMillan Pipe Band, Ulster-Scottish Pipe Band and Worcester Kiltie Pipe Band, as well as bands in grades three, four, and five. The EUSPBA also sanctions solo piping and drumming competitions from grade five to professional. The season standings of EUSPBA members, both bands and individuals, can be found on the official website.

It has been the member association of several historical grade one bands in the United States, including the City of Washington Pipe Band, Oran Mor Pipe Band, and the Stuart Highlanders.

The official publication of EUSPBA is The Voice

See also
Pipe band association
List of pipe band associations

References

External links
Official webpage
List of bands in the EUSPBA
The EUSPBA Newsletter
Results of EUSPBA-sanctioned competitions

Pipe band associations
Music organizations based in the United States